Cheng Xinru (born 10 September 1989), known as Colin Cheng, is a Singaporean sailor. He has been cited as "the top Asian sailor in the men’s laser standard class".

Cheng has resided in New South Wales, Australia since 2010, where he has studied and trained at the University of New South Wales. He competed at the 2012 Summer Olympics in the men's Laser class, finishing 15th of 49. In 2015, he competed in the 2015 SEA Games. In March–April 2016 he finished 13th in the Trofeo Princesa Sofia regatta in Spain and in May 2016 he finished 26th out of 112 in the Laser World Championships in Riviera Nayarit, Mexico. He competed at the 2016 Summer Olympics.

References

External links
 
 
 
 

1989 births
Living people
Singaporean male sailors (sport)
Olympic sailors of Singapore
Sailors at the 2012 Summer Olympics – Laser
Sailors at the 2016 Summer Olympics – Laser
Asian Games medalists in sailing
Asian Games gold medalists for Singapore
Asian Games silver medalists for Singapore
Asian Games bronze medalists for Singapore
Sailors at the 2006 Asian Games
Sailors at the 2010 Asian Games
Sailors at the 2014 Asian Games
Medalists at the 2006 Asian Games
Medalists at the 2010 Asian Games
Medalists at the 2014 Asian Games
Southeast Asian Games gold medalists for Singapore
Southeast Asian Games silver medalists for Singapore
Southeast Asian Games medalists in sailing
Competitors at the 2015 Southeast Asian Games
Singaporean expatriates in Australia
21st-century Singaporean people